Metrocorp Inc. is a media company in Philadelphia, Pennsylvania that publishes lifestyle magazines in the United States.  Metrocorp (sometimes rendered in camel case as "MetroCorp") publishes the following magazine titles:
{|
||
Boston
Concierge
Elegant Wedding
Home & Garden
New England Travel & Life
See Boston'''s Ancillary publicationsPhiladelphia|}
Metrocorp grew out of the company that has published Philadelphia magazine since 1946.  It acquired Boston magazine in 1971.  At one point it acquired, but has since sold, ownership of The Dig''. It is owned by the Lipson family.

References 

Magazine publishing companies of the United States
Publishing companies established in 1946
1946 establishments in Pennsylvania